The Atlantic Family Live at Montreux is a live recording made at the 1977 Montreux Jazz Festival. It featured the Don Ellis Orchestra together with the Average White Band and guest musicians. It was originally released as a double album on vinyl.

Track listing
LP1 side A
"Bahia (Na Baixa Do Sapateiro)" (16:32)
LP1 side B
"Jadoo" (10:34)
"Everything Must Change" (6:21)
LP2 side A
"McEwan's Export" (8:58)
"One To One" (9:10)
LP2 side B
"Pick Up the Pieces" (21:40)

Personnel 
 Ben E. King - lead vocals
 Sonny Fortune - alto sax
 David "Fathead" Newman - alto sax
 Roger Ball - alto sax
 Herbie Mann - flute
 Dick Morrissey - tenor sax
 Molly Duncan - tenor sax
 Klaus Doldinger - tenor sax
 Michael Brecker - tenor sax
 Jaroslav Jakubovic - saxophone
 Don Ellis - trumpet
 Gilman Rathel - trumpet
 Lew Soloff - trumpet
 Randy Brecker - trumpet
 Alan Kaplan - trombone
 Barry Rogers - trombone
 Richard Tee - electric piano
 Jim Mullen - guitar
 Hamish Stuart - guitar
 Rafael Cruz - percussion
 Sammy Figueroa - percussion
 Rubens Bassini - percussion
 Alan Gorrie - bass
 Steve Ferrone - drums
 Onnie McIntyre - guitar

Backing Vocals: 
 Alfa Anderson
 Diane Sumler
 Diva Gray
 Krystal Davis
 Luther Vandross
 Peter Cox
 Robin Clark

Other credits:
 Engineer - Gene Paul
 Producer - Arif Mardin

References 
The Atlantic Family Live at Montreux at [ Allmusic.com]

Albums produced by Arif Mardin
Albums recorded at the Montreux Jazz Festival
1978 live albums
Atlantic Records live albums